The 1978 Seattle Mariners season was the second in franchise history.

Offseason 
 March 27, 1978: Bob Galasso was released by the Mariners.
 March 27, 1978: Mike Kekich was released by the Mariners.

Regular season 
 October 1, 1978: Kevin Pasley hit a home run in the last at bat of his career.

Season standings

Record vs. opponents

Notable transactions 
 June 6, 1978: Vance McHenry was drafted by the Mariners in the 11th round of the 1978 Major League Baseball Draft.

Roster

Player stats

Batting

Starters by position 
Note: Pos = Position; G = Games played; AB = At bats; H = Hits; Avg. = Batting average; HR = Home runs; RBI = Runs batted in

Other batters 
Note: G = Games played; AB = At bats; H = Hits; Avg. = Batting average; HR = Home runs; RBI = Runs batted in

Pitching

Starting pitchers 
Note: G = Games pitched; IP = Innings pitched; W = Wins; L = Losses; ERA = Earned run average; SO = Strikeouts

Other pitchers 
Note: G = Games pitched; IP = Innings pitched; W = Wins; L = Losses; ERA = Earned run average; SO = Strikeouts

Relief pitchers 
Note: G = Games pitched; W = Wins; L = Losses; SV = Saves; ERA = Earned run average; SO = Strikeouts

Farm system

Notes

References 
1978 Seattle Mariners at Baseball Reference
1978 Seattle Mariners team page at www.baseball-almanac.com

Seattle Mariners seasons
Seattle Mariners season
Seattle Mariners